The 2016–17 New Mexico Lobos women's basketball team will represent the University of New Mexico during the 2016–17 NCAA Division I women's basketball season. The Lobos, led by first year head coach Mike Bradbury. They play their home games at The Pit and are a member of the Mountain West Conference. They finished the season 15–15, 10–8 in Mountain West play to finish in fifth place. They lost in the quarterfinals of the Mountain West women's tournament to Boise State.

Roster

 captain

Schedule and results

|-
!colspan=9 style="background:#D3003F; color:white;"| Exhibition

|-
!colspan=9 style="background:#D3003F; color:white;"| Non-conference regular season

|-
!colspan=9 style="background:#D3003F; color:white;"| Mountain West regular season

|-
!colspan=9 style="background:#D3003F; color:white;"|  Mountain West Women's Tournament

See also
2016–17 New Mexico Lobos men's basketball team

References 

New Mexico
New Mexico Lobos women's basketball seasons
2016 in sports in New Mexico
2017 in sports in New Mexico